The 2016–17 Memphis Tigers men's basketball team represented the University of Memphis in the 2016–17 NCAA Division I men's basketball season, the 96th season of Tiger basketball and the first under head coach Tubby Smith. The Tigers played their home games at the FedExForum. This was the fourth season the Tigers participated in the American Athletic Conference. They finished the season 19–13, 9–9 in AAC play to finish in a tie for fifth place. They lost in the quarterfinals of the AAC tournament to UCF. Despite having 19 wins, they did not participate in a postseason tournament.

Previous season
The Tigers finished the 2015–16 season with a record of 19–15 and 8–10 in AAC play to finish in a tie for fifth place in conference. The Tigers lost in the championship game of the AAC tournament to UConn. The Tigers did not participate in a postseason tournament marking the second consecutive year that the Tigers had missed the postseason entirely.

Josh Pastner left Memphis to take the head coaching job at Georgia Tech on April 8, 2016. On April 14, 2016, the school hired Tubby Smith to take over as head coach.

Offseason

Departures

Incoming transfers

Recruiting

Coaching staff
The Tigers hired coach Orlando "Tubby" Smith to replace Josh Pastner in April 2016. Smith faced his first controversy as Tiger head coach early. Keelon Lawson, father of Tiger players KJ and Dedric Lawson, had served for two years as an assistant for Pastner, but Smith did not initially want to retain Lawson in that role to make room for his son on the staff. This caused Lawson to reenter his son Dedric in the 2016 draft and hint that KJ would be transferring. However, on April 25, 2016, The Commercial Appeal reported that Lawson would be retained on the basketball staff as director of player personnel. By moving Lawson to Director of player development it prevents him from recruiting off campus. Where his close ties to area coaches and talent  would give him an advantage with Memphis area recruits. An area where Smith and his staff has been very weak in past jobs. With a recruiting class average in the 70s at Texas Tech. His first class at Memphis was ranked 92nd compared to the top 10 class in Pastner's last year at Memphis- Lawson claimed he never intended to indicate that his sons would be leaving the program upon the announcement of his reassignment. Dedric, however, remained entered in the draft and attended the draft combine before withdrawing his name in mid May and returning to Memphis.

The U of M announced that presumptive starting center Nick Marshall unexpectedly left the team on August 1, 2016 when he went to live with his pregnant girlfriend. Marshall was not expected to return to Memphis.

Roster

Schedule and results

|-
!colspan=12 style=| Exhibition
|-

|-
!colspan=12 style=| Regular season
|-

|-
!colspan=12 style=""|American Athletic Conference tournament

Rankings

References

Memphis
Memphis Tigers men's basketball seasons
Memphis
Memphis